Lagrave is a commune in the Tarn department in the Occitania region of southern France.

History

The terraces which surround the plain of the village have known human occupation since the most remote times. The places called Nareille, Las Peyrouses, Les Ganelles, Les Gounelles are known for their prehistoric resort.

The Romans under Julius Caesar conquered what is now the Tarn department in the 1st century BC. The Roman occupation lasted five centuries during which time Rome imposed its laws and language on the region. Their presence in Lagrave is attested by the discovery of medals and coins minted under the Roman emperors Claudius, Titus, Trajan, Septimius Severus and Augustus.

See also
Communes of the Tarn department

References

Communes of Tarn (department)